Live in Nashville is a live recording of metal group Demon Hunter  released on January 27, 2009. The album is the audio complement to the live DVD featured in Demon Hunter's release "45 Days."

Track listing

References

Demon Hunter albums
2009 live albums
Solid State Records live albums